Caenopedina porphyrogigas is a species of sea urchins of the Family Pedinidae. Their armour is covered with spines. Caenopedina porphyrogigas was first scientifically described in 2009 by Anderson.

References

Animals described in 2009
Pedinoida